The Reelin River is a river which flows through Glenfinn in Co. Donegal, Ireland. It is a tributary to the River Finn.

Rivers of County Donegal